G for George is an Avro Lancaster Mk. I bomber, squadron code AR-G and serial number W4783, operated by No. 460 Squadron RAAF during World War II. It is now preserved at the Australian War Memorial (AWM), Canberra, Australia.

History
G-George flew 90 operational sorties over occupied Europe with 460 Squadron, and is the second most prolific surviving Lancaster, behind R5868 S for Sugar of No. 83 Squadron RAF/No. 463 Squadron RAAF/No. 467 Squadron RAAF (137 sorties). Most operational Lancasters were shot down before they had reached 20 sorties: of the 107,085 sorties by Lancasters despatched in bombing raids on Germany 2,687 aircraft went missing. G-George has the added distinction of bringing home, alive, every crewman who flew aboard it.

Upon retirement from combat duty in 1944, G-George was flown to Australia by an all-RAAF crew of Bomber Command veterans, and played a major part in raising war bonds during a round-Australia publicity trip. Post-war, it was left to decay in the open air at RAAF Base Fairbairn, before being moved to the AWM in the early 1950s.

In 2003, G-George returned to display at the AWM in the new ANZAC Hall after a five-year restoration program at the Treloar Technology Centre, which restored the aircraft as faithfully as possible to its wartime configuration. It is displayed in conjunction with a sound and light show that attempts to convey something of the atmosphere of a World War II Bomber Command raid, and incorporates a German '88' flak gun and a Bf 109 fighter. The display is based on a sortie captained by Flying Officer "Cherry" Carter to Berlin on "Black Thursday" December 1943, so called because Bomber Command lost 50 of the 500 bombers detailed for the raid - more than half were lost in landing accidents due to bad weather.

G-George serves as a memorial to all Australians who flew with Bomber Command, and to the 1,018 dead of 460 Squadron.

The designation 'G-George' comes from the RAF phonetic alphabet in use at the time. Individual aircraft on a squadron were allocated a letter and would be referred to using the corresponding word from the phonetic alphabet. Many other RAF squadrons would also have had a G-George but with different aircraft bearing that designation as they were lost in action or otherwise.

See also
 RAF Museum, Hendon - home to Lancaster "S for Sugar"

References

Notes

Bibliography

 Moyes, Philip J.R. Bomber Squadrons of the RAF and their Aircraft. London: Macdonald and Jane's (Publishers) Ltd., 2nd edition 1976. . 
 Nelmes, Michael V. and Ian Jenkins. G-for-George: A Memorial to RAAF Bomber Crews, 1939-45. Maryborough, Queensland, Australia: Banner Books, 2000. .

External links

 The official AWM G for George page

Avro Lancaster
Collections of the Australian War Memorial
Individual aircraft of World War II
Military history of Australia during World War II